Nephology is the second studio album by German electronic artists Air Liquide, which was released in 1994.

The German and UK releases of the album contained different track listings.

Track listing

German release
 "Im Erlmeyer-Kolben Pt. I" – 2:19
 "Semwave" – 7:00
 "Die Reise im Teekessel 2" – 11:20
 "Nephology" – 3:01
 "Aurorabelt" – 3:08
 "Kymea" – 5:02
 "Stratus Static" – 8:10
 "The Clouds Have Eyes" – 6:40
 "Cassiopeia" – 5:01
 "Sulfur Clouds" – 3:55
 "Im Erlmeyer-Kolben Pt. II" – 3:58

UK release
 "The Cloud" – 9:53
 "Semiwave" – 7:03
 "Die Reise Im Teekessel" – 11:32
 "Nephology" – 3:02
 "If There Was No Gravity" – 7:44
 "Kymnea" – 5:09
 "Sulfur Clouds" – 4:06
 "Im Grlenmeyerkolben I" – 2:29
 "Im Grlenmeyerkolben II" – 4:04
 "Stratus Static" – 8:13
 "Casiopeia" – 6:05
 "The Clouds Have Eyes" – 6:44

References

External links 

 

1994 albums
Air Liquide (band) albums